West Vancouver-Capilano is a provincial electoral district for the Legislative Assembly of British Columbia, Canada.

The riding is the wealthiest constituency in British Columbia, with a median household income of $93,569 according to the 2006 Census. In every election from 1991 to 2017, the BC Liberals won this riding with at least 65% of the popular vote, making it one of the safest seats in the province for the party. That number dipped to 57% in the 2017 election.

For other current and historical North Shore and City of Vancouver ridings, please see Vancouver (electoral districts)

Demographics

Geography

History

Member of Legislative Assembly 

Its MLA is Karin Kirkpatrick. She was first elected in 2020. He represents the British Columbia Liberal Party.

Election results 

|-

|Independent 
|David O. Marley
|align="right"|1,489
|align="right"|6.57
|align="right"|
|align="right"|$45,103

|}

|-

|-
 
|NDP
|Terry Platt
|align="right"|3,900
|align="right"|18.15
|align="right"|
|align="right"|$9,903

|align="right"|$100

|}

|-

|-

|Independent
|Jeremy Dalton
|align="right"|1,355
|align="right"|6.33%
|align="right"|
|align="right"|$4,258
 
|NDP
|Matt Lovick
|align="right"|1,284
|align="right"|6.00%
|align="right"|
|align="right"|$1,714

|}

|-

|-
 
|NDP
|Daniel Reeve
|align="right"|3,486
|align="right"|14.90%
|align="right"|
|align="right"|$5,688

|Natural Law
|Carolyn Grayson
|align="right"|47
|align="right"|0.20%
|align="right"|
|align="right"|$110

|}

|-

 
|NDP
|Helen Chaplin
|align="right"|4,506
|align="right"|23.52%
|align="right"|
|align="right"|$13,905
|-

|}

References

External links 
BC Stats Profile - 2001 (pdf)
Results of 2001 election (pdf)
2001 Expenditures
Results of 1996 election
1996 Expenditures
Results of 1991 election
1991 Expenditures 
Website of the Legislative Assembly of British Columbia 

British Columbia provincial electoral districts
West Vancouver
Provincial electoral districts in Greater Vancouver and the Fraser Valley